Emarginula rosea is a species of sea snail, a marine gastropod mollusk in the family Fissurellidae, the keyhole limpets.

Description
The size of the shell attains 4.5 mm.

Distribution
TYhis marine species occurs in the Eastern Atlantic, from the British Isles to Morocco, nearshore to ca. 200 m; in the Mediterranean, mostly 50-200 m.

References

 Bell T. 1824. Description of a new species of Emarginula. Zoological Journal 1(1): 52, pl. 4 fig,. 1-2
 Fenaux A. (1942). Mollusques nouveaux du littoral occidental de la Méditerranée. Bulletin de l'Institut Océanographique 825-826-827: 2-3
 Gofas, S.; Le Renard, J.; Bouchet, P. (2001). Mollusca. in: Costello, M.J. et al. (eds), European Register of Marine Species: a check-list of the marine species in Europe and a bibliography of guides to their identification. Patrimoines Naturels. 50: 180-213

External links
 Philippi, R. A. (1836). Enumeratio molluscorum Siciliae cum viventium tum in tellure tertiaria fossilium, quae in itinere suo observavit. Vol. 1. I-XIV, 1-303, Tab. XIII-XXVIII. Schropp, Berlin
 Tiberi N. (1855). Descrizione di alcuni testacei viventi viventi nel Mediterraneo. Lettere di Nicola Tiberi. Napoli: Gaetano Noblie pp. 16
 Michaud, A.-L.-G. (1829). Description de plusieurs espèces nouvelles de coquilles vivantes. Bulletin d'Histoire Naturelle de la Société Linnéenne de Bordeaux. 3: 260-276

Fissurellidae
Gastropods described in 1824